Anomalotragus is a genus of beetles in the family Cerambycidae, containing the following species:

References

Rhinotragini